Margaret Street may be:

 Margaret Street, Brisbane, Australia
 Margaret Street, Birmingham, United Kingdom
 Margaret Street, London, United Kingdom

See also
 Margaret Street Chapel, London, United Kingdom